Underhill is an unincorporated community located in the town of Underhill, Oconto County, Wisconsin, United States.

Images

References

Unincorporated communities in Oconto County, Wisconsin
Unincorporated communities in Wisconsin